The Shepherd of Hermas (Poimēn tou Herma), sometimes just called The Shepherd, is a Christian literary work of the late first half of the second century, considered a valuable book by many Christians, and considered canonical scripture by some of the early Church fathers such as Irenaeus. The Shepherd was very popular amongst Christians in the 2nd, 3rd, and 4th centuries. It is found in the Codex Sinaiticus.

Language and translation
The book was originally written in Rome in Koine Greek. A first Latin translation, the Vulgata (common language), was made very shortly afterwards. A second Latin translation, the Palatina, was made at the beginning of the fifth century. Of the Greek version, the last fifth or so is missing. The Vulgata is therefore the earliest translation and the most complete witness.

The Shepherd was also translated at least twice into the Coptic (Egyptian) language and fragments of translations in both the Sahidic and Akhmimic dialects survive. Three translations into Ge'ez (Ethiopic) were also made, but none survives complete. The sole surviving Georgian translation seems to have been made from an Arabic version, but no Arabic translation has been preserved. There does not appear to have been a Syriac translation and no Syriac author shows any awareness of the Shepherd. It was always more popular in the Western Roman Empire and in Alexandria than in the rest of the east. There was a Middle Persian translation made for a Manichaean readership which survives in a single fragmentary manuscript found at Turfan in what is now China.

Contents

The book consists of five visions granted to Hermas, a former slave. This is followed by twelve mandates or commandments, and ten similitudes (aka parables). It commences abruptly in the first person: "He who brought me up sold me to a certain Rhoda, who was at Rome. After many years I met her again, and began to love her as a sister." As Hermas is on the road to Cumae, he has a vision of Rhoda. She tells him that she is now his accuser in heaven, on account of unchaste and impure thoughts the (now) married narrator once had regarding her. He is to repent and pray for forgiveness, for himself and all his house. He is consoled by a vision of the Church in the form of an aged woman, weak and helpless from the sins of her unfaithful children, who tells him to bear fruits of repentance and to correct the sins of his children. Subsequently, after his repentance he sees her made younger, yet still wrinkled and with white hair; then again, later she appears as quite young but still with white hair; and lastly, she shows herself as a glorious Bride.

This allegorical language continues through the other parts of the work. In the second vision she gives Hermas a book, which she later takes back in order to add to it. The fifth vision, which is represented as taking place 20 days after the fourth, introduces "the Angel (Messenger) of repentance" in the guise of a shepherd, from whom the whole work takes its name. He delivers to Hermas a series of precepts (mandata, entolai), which form an interesting development of early Christian ethics. One point which deserves special mention is the instruction of a Christian husband's obligation to forgive and take back an adulterous wife upon her repentance. The eleventh mandate, on humility, is concerned with false prophets who desire to occupy the primary, or best seats (that is to say, among the presbyters). Some have seen here a reference to Marcion, who came to Rome c. 140 and desired to be admitted among the priests (or possibly even to become bishop of Rome).

After the mandates come ten similitudes (parabolai) in the form of visions, which are explained by the angel. The longest of these (Similitude 9) is an elaboration of the parable of the building of a tower, which had formed the matter of the third vision. The tower is the Church, and the stones of which it is built are the faithful. In the third vision it looks as though only the holy are a part of the true Church; in Similitude 9 it is clearly pointed out that all the baptized are included, though they may be cast out for grave sins, and can be readmitted only after repentance.

Authorship and date
Textual criticism, the nature of the theology, and the author's apparent familiarity with the Book of Revelation and other Johannine texts are thought to set the date of composition in the 2nd century.
However, several ancient witnesses support an early dating and there is internal evidence for the place and date of this work in the language and theology of the work. The reference to an unknown Clement is presumed by some to be Clement of Rome; if this is that Clement, it would suggest a date c. 90 for at least the historicised setting of the first two visions. Since Paul sent greetings to a Hermas, a Christian of Rome (Romans 16:14), a minority have followed Origen of Alexandria's opinion that he was the author of this religious allegory.

We have three ancient witnesses, who claim to identify the author of this writing. These authorities may be citing the same source, perhaps Hegesippus, whose lost history of the early Church provided material for Eusebius of Caesarea. The witnesses are the Muratorian fragment, the Liberian Catalogue of Popes (a record that was later used in the writing of the Liber Pontificalis) and a poem written by "Pseudo-Tertullian" against Marcion in the 3rd or 4th century AD.

The Muratorian fragment is a list written c. 170 AD (although some scholars now question this date and prefer to assign the fragment to the 4th century) that may be the earliest known canon of New Testament writings. It identifies Hermas, the author of The Shepherd, as the brother of Pius I, bishop of Rome:

Theology 
In parable 5, the author mentions a Son of God, as a virtuous man filled with a holy "pre-existent spirit" and adopted as the Son. In the 2nd century, adoptionism (the view that Jesus Christ was, at least initially, only a mortal man) was one of two competing doctrines about Jesus's true nature, the other being that he pre-existed as the Word (Logos) or only-begotten Son of God and is to be identified as such from his conception; Christ's identity as the Logos (Jn 1:1), in which the Logos is further understood to be uncreated and coessentially divine with God (that is, the Father), was affirmed in 325 at the First Council of Nicaea. Bogdan G. Bucur says the document was widely accepted among orthodox Christians, yet was not criticized for apparently exhibiting an adoptionistic Christology. He says that the passage in question should be understood as Jesus making his dwelling within those who submit to his spirit, so that the adoption that takes place is not of Jesus, but of his followers.

Some believe that Hermas has a binitarian understanding of God, as it calls the Holy Spirit the Son of God. Not all, however agree that Hermas has binitarianism. Kelly calls the Christology of Hermas "an amalgam of binitarianism and adoptionism.  

Hermas has a synergist understanding of soteriology, where both works and faith are needed to be saved. For Hermas baptism is necessary to be saved and warns those who undergo baptism by the danger of postbaptismal sins. Shepherd of Hermas possibly supports delaying baptism for practical reasons which is because of the fear of post-baptismal sins. According to Hermas, those who fall into sin after baptism, have only one chance of penance.

The book has a high emphasis on morals and the work is an indication of Jewish Christianity — still keeping the Law of Moses.

Hermas has some similarities to Montanism, such as a support of a belief in prophetic gifts and disciplinarian rigorism, however a direct connection does not exist.

The principles which Novatian formulated have their origin in the Shepherd of Hermas.

Some have argued that Hermas is the first example of Pre-tribulational rapture.  Though Hermas does not mention a rapture, he writes of believers that "have escaped from great tribulation on account of [their] faith" and that others could also escape "the great tribulation that is coming".

Place in Christian literature
Tertullian implies that Pope Callixtus I had quoted it as an authority (though evidently not as one of the books of the Bible), for he replies: "I would admit your argument, if the writing of The Shepherd had deserved to be included in the Divine Instrument, and if it were not judged by every council of the Churches, even of your own Churches, among the apocryphal." And again, he says that the Epistle of Barnabas, which is Tertullian's name for the New Testament Epistle to the Hebrews, is "more received among the Churches than the apocryphal epistle of the Shepherd".

Editions 
The Greek text is edited by Gebhardt and Harnack (Leipzig, 1877), by Funk (Tübingen, 1901), and, with its English translation, by Lightfoot, Apostolic Fathers, edited by Harmon (London, 1893); the Codex Sinaiticus of Hermas was edited by Lake (Oxford, 1911). The English translation by William Wake (Archbishop of Canterbury 1716–1737) is given in W. Hone and J. Jones's Apocryphal New Testament (London, 1820). An English translation is also in volume ii of the American edition of Ante-Nicene Fathers, edited by Roberts and Donaldson (Buffalo, 1886). In general, consult:
 Cruttwell, Literary History of Early Christianity, volume ii (London, 1893).
 Krüger, History of Early Christian Literature (New York, 1897).
 Harnack, Chronologie der altchristlichen Literatur, volume i (Leipzig, 1897).
 Taylor, The Shepherd of Hermas (New York, 1901).

See also
 Confession in the first two centuries
 Hermas of Philippopolis
 Papyrus 129
 Shoulder angel

References

Further reading
 Carolyn Osiek, "Wealth and Poverty in the Shepherd of Hermas," Studia Patristica, Vol 17, Pt 2, 1982, 725–730.
 Carolyn Osiek, "The Genre and Function of the Shepherd of Hermas," Semeia, 36, 1986, 113–121.
 U. Neymeyr, Die christliche Lehrer im zweiten Jahrhundert. Ihre Lehrtätigkeit, ihr Selbsverständnis und ihre Geschichte (Leiden, 1989) (Vigiliae Christianae. Supplements, 4), 9–15.
 Carolyn Osiek, "The Second Century through the Eyes of Hermas: Continuity and Change," Biblical Theology Bulletin, 20, 1990, 116–122.
 D. P. O'Brien, "The Cumaean Sibyl as the Revelation-bearer in the Shepherd of Hermas," Journal of Early Christian Studies, 5, 1997, No. 4.
 Carolyn Osiek, "The Shepherd of Hermas in Context," Acta Patristica et Byzantina, 8, 1997, 115–134.
 Carolyn Osiek, "The Oral World of Early Christianity in Rome: The Case of Hermas.," in Karl P. Donfried and Peter Richardson (eds), Judaism and Christianity in First-Century Rome (Grand Rapids, 1998), 151–172.
 Carolyn Osiek, Shepherd of Hermas: A Commentary (Minneapolis, 1999).
 Jörg Rüpke, "Apokalyptische Salzberge: Zum sozialen Ort und zur literarischen Strategie des 'Hirten des Hermas'," Archiv für Religionsgeschichte, 1, 1999, 148–160.
 Jörg Rüpke, "Der Hirte des Hermas: Plausibilisierungs- und Legitimierungs strategien im Übergang von Antike und Christentum," Zeitschrift für antikes Christentum, 7, 2003, 362–384.
 Marco Frenschkowski, "Vision als Imagination. Beobachtungen zum differenzierten Wirklichkeitsanspruch fruehchristlicher Visionsliteratur," in Nicola Hoemke, Manuel Baumbach (hrsg), Fremde Wirklichkeiten: Literarische Phantastik und antike Literatur (Heidelberg, 2006) (Studien zur griechischen und lateinischen Poesie, 6), 339–366.
 Joseph Verheyden, "The Shepherd of Hermas," in Paul Foster (ed), Writings of the Apostolic Fathers (London, 2007) (T & T Clark Biblical Studies).
 Christian Tornau - Paolo Cecconi (Eds.), The Shepherd of Hermas in Latin. Critical Edition of the Oldest Translation Vulgata, Walter de Gruyter, Berlin/Boston 2014.

External links

 A large collection of English translations of The Shepherd of Hermas, including some in modern English.
 Greek text of The Shepherd of Hermas
 Archbishop Wake's English Translation of The Shepherd of Hermas
 The Shepherd of Hermas (English Translation) Early Christian Writings
 Shepherd of Hermas Critical Translation + Audio Dramatization Biblicalaudio
 
 
 Hermas' Shepherd on earlychurch.org.uk Bibliography and links to on-line articles.
 Fragments of Hermas in Amherst Papyri

2nd-century Christian texts
Apostolic Fathers
Christian anti-Gnosticism
New Testament apocrypha
Antilegomena
Nature of Jesus Christ